Adactylotis contaminaria, the brindled three-lined moth,  is a species of moth in the  family Geometridae. It is found in Belgium, France, Spain, Switzerland and Italy.

The wingspan is 38–44 mm. Adults are on wing from April to May and again from September to October in two generations per year.

The larvae feed on Quercus species.

References

External links

Lepiforum.de

Moths described in 1813
Boarmiini
Moths of Europe
Taxa named by Jacob Hübner